Myanmar is scheduled to compete at the 2021 Southeast Asian Games in Hanoi, Vietnam. Originally scheduled to take place in 2021, the Games were postponed to 12 May to 23 May 2022, due to the COVID-19 pandemic. The Myanmar Olympic Committee sent a Myanmar sports team to compete in 20 sports. 

Following the coup d'état on 1 February 2021, a change of leadership took place in the Myanmar Olympic Committee. The sports sector from former Ministry of Health and Sports was reorganized into the Ministry of Sports and Youth Affairs. During the 2020 Summer Olympics, some athletes have refused to represent Myanmar. Some Athletes will not compete also in Vietnam SEA Games.  Myanmar athletes have been training for Vietnam SEA Games since April 2021.

Medal summary

Medal by sport

Medalists

Gold

Silver

Bronze

Billiards
The Myanmar team will compete in Billiards with four pool competitions and two carom competitions.

Bodybuilding
Eleven athletes are training camp to compete in bodybuilding competitions.

Football

Men's tournament

Group stage

Judo
The Myanmar team will compete in judo.

Sepak takraw
The Myanmar team will compete in sepak takraw.

Shooting
The Myanmar team will compete in shooting.

References

Southeast Asian Games
2021
Nations at the 2021 Southeast Asian Games